Sir Walter Kingsmill (10 April 1864 – 15 January 1935) was an Australian politician who served as a Senator for Western Australia from 1923 to 1935. He was President of the Senate from 1929 to 1932.

Early life
Kingsmill was born on 10 April 1864 in Glenelg, South Australia. He was the son of Jane Elizabeth (née Haslam) and Walter Kingsmill; his father was a pastoralist.

Kingsmill attended St Peter's College, Adelaide. He graduated Bachelor of Arts from the University of Adelaide in 1883 and subsequently joined the Geological Department of South Australia. In 1886 he left the public service to work as a prospector, spending time on the Teetulpa and Mannahill goldfields and in the Barrier Ranges of New South Wales.

In 1888, Kingsmill moved to Western Australia, initially settling in Perth where he represented the Victorians Football Club in two matches in the West Australian Football League during the 1888 season. He soon moved to the north-west to participate in the Pilbara goldrush, remaining in the district for eight years where he managed the Stray Shot, Excelsior, Augusta, and Talga-Talga mines. He served as mining registrar at Marble Bar from November 1894 to October 1895 and was also a member of the Pilbara Road Board.

Western Australian politics
In 1897, he was elected to the Western Australian Legislative Assembly as the member for Pilbara. He moved to the Legislative Council in 1903. He served as Minister for Public Works in 1901, Commissioner for Railways 1901–1902, Colonial Secretary 1902–1904 and 1905–1906, and Minister for Education 1902–1904 and 1905–1906. He was President of the Legislative Council 1919–1922.

Federal politics

In 1922, he was elected to the Australian Senate as a Nationalist Senator for Western Australia. On 14 August 1929, he was elected  President of the Senate, serving until 30 August 1932, when he was replaced by Patrick Lynch.

On 7 May 1931, Kingsmill chaired the meeting of opposition members at which the United Australia Party came into existence as a parliamentary party. He retired at the 1934 election, but died on 15 January 1935 while still a senator, necessitating the early appointment of Allan MacDonald (who had been elected to succeed him).

Personal life
Kingsmill married Mary Fanning in 1899, but had no children. He moved to Sydney after his election to the Senate and died of a coronary occlusion at his home in Elizabeth Bay on 15 January 1935, aged 70.

Kingsmill served two terms as president of the Lawn Tennis Association of Western Australia and was voted a life member. He was the president of the board of Perth Zoo from 1916 to 1922 and acting director from 1916 to 1917, during which time he travelled to Singapore and the Federated Malay States to buy animals. He was also a member of the senate of the University of Western Australia and the Kings Park board.

References

 

Nationalist Party of Australia members of the Parliament of Australia
United Australia Party members of the Parliament of Australia
Members of the Australian Senate for Western Australia
Members of the Australian Senate
Presidents of the Australian Senate
Members of the Western Australian Legislative Assembly
Members of the Western Australian Legislative Council
Presidents of the Western Australian Legislative Council
Australian Knights Bachelor
1864 births
1935 deaths
People educated at St Peter's College, Adelaide
West Perth Football Club players
Australian rules footballers from Western Australia
Australian sportsperson-politicians
20th-century Australian politicians
Australian prospectors